Y.3176 is an ITU-T Recommendation, building upon Y.3172 and Y.3173, specifying a  framework for evaluation intelligence levels of future networks such as 5G (IMT-2020). 

This Recommendation provides high-level requirements and the architecture for integrating ML marketplaces in future networks including IMT-2020. Based on these requirements, the architecture for the integration of ML marketplaces is described taking into account the architectural framework in Y.3172 as a basis.

Keywords
architecture, federation, future networks, IMT-2020, life-cycle, machine learning, management, marketplace, model, network functions, requirements

References

External links 

 ITU-T Recommendation Y.3176

ITU-T recommendations
ITU-T Y Series Recommendations